Jack Baden Tua Grooby (born 1 September 1998) is a New Zealand rugby union player. His position of choice is Halfback. Grooby was educated at Nelson College from 2014 to 2016.

Tasman
Grooby appeared 9 times for the Mako in the 2018 season. Grooby missed both the 2019 Mitre 10 Cup and the 2020 Mitre 10 Cup with injury in which the Mako won back to back premiership titles.

References

1998 births
Living people
New Zealand rugby union players
People educated at Nelson College
People from Murchison, New Zealand
Rugby union players from the Tasman District
Rugby union scrum-halves
Tasman rugby union players